The National Navy UDT-SEAL Museum, also known as the Navy SEAL Museum, is located in St. Lucie County, just outside Fort Pierce, Florida. It houses exhibits to inform and educate on the role of Navy Underwater Demolition Teams (UDT) and Sea, Air, Land (SEAL) teams. The museum also preserves the history of the SEALs (the original Navy frogmen first trained outside of Fort Pierce).

The idea of the museum originated in the home of Albert Stankie, where he and other former UDT Frogmen gathered personal artifacts and experiences from their service in World War II. They worked to procure the defunct Ft. Pierce Treasure Museum building and site. The Navy SEAL Museum sits on public land owned by Florida. This evolved into a dedicated facility, which opened in 1985, and was recognized as a National Museum by an act of Congress signed into law February 7, 2008.

UDT-SEAL memorial

The museum's focal point is a UDT-SEAL Memorial, dedicated to Navy SEALs and their predecessors. The memorial consists of a 500-pound, 9-foot-tall, bronze sculpture of a modern Navy SEAL. The names of all Underwater Demolition Team members—the "Frogmen" of World War II and modern Navy SEALs—who have died in the service of the country are carved into black granite panels on the walls surrounding the sculpture and its reflecting pool.

Other notable exhibits
The museum collection includes several artifacts dating from the SEALs' founding, from the days of Scouts & Raiders, through the Underwater Demolition Teams, to recent present-day Navy SEAL activities:
 Original World War II–era obstacles used for demolition training before the Normandy landings ("D-Day").
 LCPL "the Shark Tooth Boat" the UDT used during the Pacific Ocean theater of World War II and Korean War.
 Patrol Boat River (PBR), used during the Vietnam era. These boats had a shallow draft and jet drive making them ideal for insertion and extraction in the rivers and canals of the region.
 Apollo program spacecraft—the actual training devices used by the UDT "frogmen" recovery teams during the Apollo, Gemini, and Mercury space missions.
Mark V Special Operations Craft (SOC), an 82-foot and 52-plus ton boat operated by Special Boat Teams, used as a medium-range insertion and extraction platform for Navy SEALs. It saw service for coastal patrol and reconnaissance.
 SEAL Delivery Vehicles or SDVs, specifically the MK XII MOD 0, the MARK IX (9), and the MARK VII (7) MOD 0, which are mini-subs that flood inside (the operators wear compressed air tanks). These SDVs are used to enter enemy harbors clandestinely.
 Various SEAL vehicles from operations in Kuwait, Afghanistan, and Iraq.
 The MV Maersk Alabama lifeboat aboard which Somali pirates held Captain Richard Phillips hostage during the Maersk Alabama hijacking.
 A wall honoring Medal of Honor recipients, with citations for each one.

Controversies
On August 2, 2020, a video surfaced showing a live service dog demonstration in front of a crowd of civilians and uniformed military personnel at the museum in 2019. The demonstration included four dogs attacking a museum staff member wearing the jersey of former NFL quarterback Colin Kaepernick over his protective equipment. Kaepernick had knelt during the national anthem at the start of NFL games in protest of police brutality and racial inequality in the United States.

In response to the footage, the Commander of US Navy Special Warfare Command Rear Admiral Collin Green suspended the SEALs' support for the museum saying, "Each and every one of us serves to protect our fellow Americans - ALL Americans. Even the perception that our commitment to serving the men and women of this nation is applied unevenly is destructive," and that "We will revisit our relationship with the Museum when I am convinced that they have made the necessary changes to ensure this type of behavior does not happen again."

See also
List of maritime museums in the United States

Notes

External links

 Official website

1985 establishments in Florida
Fort Pierce, Florida
Military and war museums in Florida
Museums in St. Lucie County, Florida
Naval museums in the United States
Museums established in 1985
Armed forces diving
United States Navy SEALs
Navy UDT-SEAL Museum
Navy UDT-SEAL Museum